American Basketball League is a name that has been used by four defunct basketball leagues in the US:
American Basketball League (1925–1955), the first major professional basketball league
American Basketball League (1961–1962), a league that only played a single full season
American Basketball League (1996–1998), a women's basketball league
American Basketball League (2013–2015), a semi-professional men's basketball league

See also
American Basketball Association